HEATH (plagiarism/outsource) by Tan Lin is book "set" in plain text, composed of a mash up of data sources from RSS feeds, blog posts, Google searches, retrieved photographs, handwritten notes, and items of that nature.  It is divided into multiple parts, the most famous of which being plagiarism/outsource.
Lin devotes part of the book to a series of web searches regarding the death of actor Heath Ledger in 2008 in Untilted Health Ledger Project, which is assumed to be the reason for the name of the whole book.

Tan Lin 
Tan Lin is a poet, novelist, filmmaker, and new media artist born in Seattle to Chinese American parents from Shanghai.  With a BA from Carleton College and an MA and PhD from Columbia University, his work is tied to cultural and media studies with an emphasis on issues involving copyright, plagiarism, and technology.  He currently teaches creative writing at Columbia University and New Jersey City University.

His other works include the poetry collection Seven Controlled Vocabularies and Obituary 2004: The Joy of Cooking (2010) and most recently, Insomnia (2011).  He has also received several awards, including an Andy Warhol Foundation/Creative Capital Arts Writing grant and an Asian American Arts Alliance’s Urban Artist grant.

Sections of HEATH 
HEATH is part of a series of works categorized as "uncreative writing", in which texts and pictures previously written or created by others are compiled into a different work in order to convey a different feeling or message.  Other "uncreative" writers include Kenneth Goldsmith and Stephanie Barber.

plagiarism/outsource 
Tan Lin presents a massive accumulation of language and graphics from several sources, most of which are from the Internet.  These sources include commercial ads, programs from the Museum of Modern Art, blogs, RSS feeds, and social media sites such as Facebook.  He includes corporate logos, pictures of the drug Ecstasy, reactions towards the death of actor Heath Ledger in 2008, and bits of academic articles.

The text presents somewhat of a "confession" to plagiarism, as Lin quotes "numerous works were plagiarized while writing this text, in terms of ideas or turns of phrase, which the author attempted to imitate."  He complicates authorship even further by plagiarizing himself with text from his lectures, notes, and other poems, as well as other outside sources such as Google’s Project Gutenberg.  Lin plays around with notions of appropriation, copyright, and censorship, which are all seen as major issues in the age of digital language.

Notes towards the definition of culture 
Notes Towards the Definition of Culture prompts various questions on the subject of writing through technology.  HEATH reviewer Laurie Macfee asks, "Is an RSS feed a manifestation of collective intellectual achievement, a form of art, or is it more related to the scientific notion of culture and an artificial medium that promotes or cultivates replication?"  This passage has been extensively linked to the development of a culture study concerning the ‘whole way of life,’ intriguing Lin due to its composition of predominately non-humans.

The title of this passage is "plagiarized" from author T.S. Eliot's own Notes Towards the Definition of Culture, written in 1948.

Untilted Heath Ledger Project 
This section of the text involves the death of actor Heath Ledger in 2008.  Lin created a compilation of web searches and interviews surrounding the event, along with its relation to the media and how celebrities are portrayed through a screen.

Readers and critics of HEATH point out the fact that upon initial reading, the brain automatically corrects the word "untilted" to "untitled", prompting different analytical suggestions for why Lin decided to title the section as such.  Some may see it as a humorous typo and reference to the fact that most readers overlook the spelling of the word, while others can argue the reasoning for the typo using the opposite definition of the word "tilt" (i.e. if tilt means unsteady or slanted, "untilted" would mean steady or firm in agreement).  Additionally, "Untitled Heath Ledger Project" was the title of Christ Norris's New York Times article following Ledger’s death, which coincidentally is another newspaper story that Lin plagiarizes in HEATH.

a history of the search engine 
Lin presents a short history of the search engine and modern-day web browsing, from Archie in 1990 to Google in 1996 to Bing in 2009.  The ability to immediately search for information on any topic has started to be considered an art form.  Concurrently, in the 23 years that search engines have been around, other web-related forms of searching and storing information have risen, such as news feeds, open directories, and online indexes full of endless information.

Writer Danny Snelson comments on the fact that Lin uses "a history" rather than "the history", indicating that Lin's a history of the search engine is a collected singular history of the web, and that there could be many other versions or details that were left out.  Going along with the repetition of plagiarizing from other works, Lin notes that "no solely paper bound or cloth bound books were used for this work ... articles, quotes, and ideas have been annotated extensively, re-written, and removed from the following online platforms."  Snelson also relates HEATH to Ambience is a Novel with a Logo, written by Lin in 2007, which features a subtitle system consisting of citations in the format of Google search entries which correspond to passages from the body of the text.

disco OS 
Similar to the intentional mistake of "untilted", disco OS creatively misrenders Disk Operation System, translating the computational interface between users, applications, and hardware into the "post-medium" networks of disco.  Once again Lin plagiarized himself from an essay he wrote in 2008 called Disco as Operating System, which linked the generic cultural dance phenomenon to the digital age of programmed language and shed light on the production of the book.

Uncreative writing 
Writers and artists take text, pictures, and other forms of media that have already been written or created and transform them into a completely different work in order to convey or display a different message or meaning. Other "uncreative" artists include Stephanie Burt, Stephanie Barber, and Kenneth Goldsmith.  Much like these authors, Lin works around the idea of authorship itself, observing that "as the price of originality has gone down, the price of plagiarism has sky-rocketed."

References 

2007 books
New media